Pochinkovsky District is an administrative district (raion), one of the forty in Nizhny Novgorod Oblast, Russia. Municipally, it is incorporated as Pochinkovsky Municipal District. It is located in the southeast of the oblast. Its administrative center is the rural locality (a selo) of Pochinki. Population: 30,668 (2010 Census);  The population of Pochinki accounts for 38.8% of the district's total population.

History
The district was established in 1929.

References

Notes

Sources

External links
Official website of Pochinkovsky District Administration 
Official website of Pochinkovsky District Council 

Districts of Nizhny Novgorod Oblast
States and territories established in 1929
 
